Cinnabar, or cinnabarite, is the bright scarlet to brick-red form of mercury(II) sulfide (HgS). It is the most common source ore for refining elemental mercury and is the historic source for the brilliant red or scarlet pigment termed vermilion and associated red mercury pigments.

Cinnabar generally occurs as a vein-filling mineral associated with recent volcanic activity and alkaline hot springs. The mineral resembles quartz in symmetry and in its exhibiting birefringence. Cinnabar has a mean refractive index near 3.2, a hardness between 2.0 and 2.5, and a specific gravity of approximately 8.1. The color and properties derive from a structure that is a hexagonal crystalline lattice belonging to the trigonal crystal system, crystals that sometimes exhibit twinning.

Cinnabar has been used for its color since antiquity in the Near East, including as a rouge-type cosmetic, in the New World since the Olmec culture, and in China since as early as the Yangshao culture, where it was used in coloring stoneware.

Associated modern precautions for use and handling of cinnabar arise from the toxicity of the mercury component, which was recognized as early as ancient Rome.

Etymology 
In Latin, it was sometimes known as minium, meaning also "red cinnamon", though both of these terms now refer specifically to lead tetroxide.

Properties and structure

Properties 
Cinnabar is generally found in a massive, granular or earthy form and is bright scarlet to brick-red in color, though it occasionally occurs in crystals with a nonmetallic adamantine luster. It resembles quartz in its symmetry. It exhibits birefringence, and it has the second-highest refractive index of any mineral. Its mean refractive index is 3.08 (sodium light wavelengths), versus the indices for diamond and the non-mineral gallium(III) arsenide (GaAs), which are 2.42 and 3.93, respectively. The hardness of cinnabar is 2.0–2.5 on the Mohs scale, and its specific gravity 8.1.

Structure 

Structurally, cinnabar belongs to the trigonal crystal system. It occurs as thick tabular or slender prismatic crystals or as granular to massive incrustations. Crystal twinning occurs as simple contact twins.

Mercury(II) sulfide, HgS, adopts the cinnabar structure described, and one additional structure, i.e. it is dimorphous. Cinnabar is the more stable form, and is a structure akin to that of HgO: each Hg center has two short Hg−S bonds (each 2.36 Å), and four longer  contacts (with 3.10, 3.10, 3.30 and 3.30 Å separations). In addition, HgS is found in a black, non-cinnabar polymorph (metacinnabar) that has the zincblende structure.

Occurrence 

Cinnabar generally occurs as a vein-filling mineral associated with recent volcanic activity and alkaline hot springs. Cinnabar is deposited by epithermal ascending aqueous solutions (those near surface and not too hot) far removed from their igneous source. It is associated with native mercury, stibnite, realgar, pyrite, marcasite, opal, quartz, chalcedony, dolomite, calcite and barite.

Cinnabar is essentially found in all mineral extraction localities that yield mercury, notably Almadén (Spain). This mine was exploited from Roman times until 1991, being for centuries the most important cinnabar deposit in the world. Good cinnabar crystals have also been found there. Cinnabar deposits also appear in Giza (Egypt); Puerto Princesa (Philippines); New Almaden, Hastings Mine, St. John's Mine, Vallejo, California (United States); Idrija (Slovenia); New Idria, California (United States);  near Obermoschel in the Palatinate; La Ripa, at the foot of the Apuan Alps and in the Mount Amiata (Tuscany, Italy); the mountain Avala (Serbia); Huancavelica (Peru); Murfreesboro, Arkansas (United States); Terlingua, Texas (United States); and the province of Guizhou in China and Western ghats in India where fine crystals have been obtained. It was also mined near Red Devil, Alaska (United States) on the middle Kuskokwim River. Red Devil was named after the Red Devil cinnabar mine, a primary source of mercury. It has been found in Dominica near its sulfur springs at the southern end of the island along the west coast.

Cinnabar is still being deposited, such as from the hot waters of Sulphur Bank Mine in California and Steamboat Springs, Nevada (United States).

Mining and extraction of mercury 

As the most common source of mercury in nature, cinnabar has been mined for thousands of years, even as far back as the Neolithic Age. During the Roman Empire it was mined both as a pigment, and for its mercury content.

To produce liquid mercury (quicksilver), crushed cinnabar ore is roasted in rotary furnaces. Pure mercury separates from sulfur in this process and easily evaporates. A condensing column is used to collect the liquid metal, which is most often shipped in iron flasks.

Toxicity 

Associated modern precautions for use and handling of cinnabar arise from the toxicity of the mercury component, which was recognized as early as in ancient Rome. Because of its mercury content, cinnabar can be toxic to human beings. Overexposure to mercury, mercurialism, was seen as an occupational disease to the ancient Romans. Though people in ancient South America often used cinnabar for art, or processed it into refined mercury (as a means to gild silver and gold to objects), the toxic properties of mercury were well known. It was dangerous to those who mined and processed cinnabar; it caused shaking, loss of sense, and death. Data suggests that mercury was retorted from cinnabar and the workers were exposed to the toxic mercury fumes.

Decorative use 
Cinnabar has been used for its color since antiquity in the Near East, including as a rouge-type cosmetic, in the New World since the Olmec culture, and in China for writing on oracle bones as early as the Zhou dynasty. Late in the Song dynasty it was used in coloring lacquerware.

Cinnabar's use as a color in the New World, since the Olmec culture, is exemplified by its use in royal burial chambers during the peak of Maya civilization, most dramatically in the 7th-century tomb of the Red Queen in Palenque, where the remains of a noble woman and objects belonging to her in her sarcophagus were completely covered with bright red powder made from cinnabar.

The most popularly known use of cinnabar is in Chinese carved lacquerware, a technique that apparently originated in the Song dynasty. The danger of mercury poisoning may be reduced in ancient lacquerware by entraining the powdered pigment in lacquer, but could still pose an environmental hazard if the pieces were accidentally destroyed. In the modern jewellery industry, the toxic pigment is replaced by a resin-based polymer that approximates the appearance of pigmented lacquer.

Two female mummies dated AD 1399 to 1475 found in Cerro Esmeralda in Chile in 1976 had clothes colored with cinnabar.

Other forms 
 Hepatic cinnabar, or paragite, is an impure brownish variety from the mines of Idrija in the Carniola region of Slovenia, in which the cinnabar is mixed with bituminous and earthy matter.
 Hypercinnabar crystallizes at high temperature in the hexagonal crystal system.
 Metacinnabar is a black-colored form of mercury(II) sulfide, which crystallizes in the cubic crystal system.
 Synthetic cinnabar is produced by treatment of mercury(II) salts with hydrogen sulfide to precipitate black, synthetic metacinnabar, which is then heated in water. This conversion is promoted by the presence of sodium sulfide.

See also 

 China red
 Classification of minerals
 List of minerals
Mercury cycle
Red pigments

References

Further reading

External links 

 MSDS for cinnabar
 Dartmouth Toxic Metals Research Program – Mercury
 Cinnabar visual reference

Sulfide minerals
Mercury(II) minerals
Trigonal minerals
Minerals in space group 152 or 154
Traditional Chinese medicine
Alchemical substances